Jayden Andrew Reid (born 22 April 2001) is an English professional footballer who plays as a winger or forward for  club Portsmouth.

Reid came through the youth systems of Manchester United and Swansea City before turning professional with Birmingham City in 2019. He made his Football League debut towards the end of the 2019–20 EFL Championship season, and spent time on loan to Barrow and Walsall in 2020–21. Birmingham released him in 2021 and he signed for Portsmouth.

Career
Reid was born in 2001 in Luton, Bedfordshire. His older brother Tyler also became a professional footballer. Tyler joined Manchester United's Academy in 2012, and Jayden followed him. After Tyler signed for Swansea City, Jayden again followed him, and took up a two-year scholarship with the club. He played on the wing or as an attacking midfielder for the under-18 team and occasionally for the under-23s, but was not offered a professional contract when his scholarship came to an end.

A trial with West Ham United came to nothing, but trials with Championship club Birmingham City at the end of the 2018–19 season led to a one-year professional contract, with an option of a second year. Birmingham's then academy manager, Kristjaan Speakman, saw him as "a forward player best suited to central areas [who] has demonstrated good ability in and around the box." Once recovered from an ankle injury that interrupted his progress, he scored freely for Birmingham's under-23 team and was given a first-team squad number in February 2020. The club took their one-year option on his contract, and when the 2019–20 EFL Championship season resumed after its suspension because of the COVID-19 pandemic, he was named among nine substitutes for Birmingham's first match under the temporary rules, on 20 June away at West Bromwich Albion, but remained unused. He made his senior debut on 8 July, at home to his former club Swansea City, replacing Jérémie Bela after 77 minutes with his team 3–1 down, which was the final score. He finished the season with four appearances, all from the bench.

Reid had no involvement in Birmingham's matchday squad under new head coach Aitor Karanka, who thought he would benefit from greater experience of competitive football, so on 16 October 2020, he joined League Two club Barrow on loan until 3 January 2021. He made his debut four days later, replacing the injured Scott Quigley ten minutes into the second half with his team 3–2 up at home to Bolton Wanderers; the visitors equalised in the 95th minute. He made 12 appearances in all competitions, mainly as a substitute, before returning to Birmingham when his loan expired.

He joined another League Two club, Walsall, on 19 January 2021 on loan for the remainder of the season. He was a regular on the bench, but made only one appearance, playing the first half of the visit to Exeter City on 2 March, before returning to Birmingham by mutual consent later that month. Walsall's manager, Brian Dutton, said that Reid was "frustrated that he'd not had enough minutes and he felt that he would stand a better chance of earning a contract somewhere else next season, whether that's with Birmingham or another club." In May 2021, Birmingham confirmed that Reid would leave the club when his contract expired at the end of the season. His last appearance was for Birmingham's U23 team as they beat Sheffield United U23 in the national final of the 2020–21 Professional Development League.

After a trial, Reid signed a one-year deal with League One club Portsmouth on 20 July 2021. A few minutes into his first pre-season friendly, he suffered a ruptured cruciate ligament.

Career statistics

References

2001 births
Living people
Footballers from Luton
English footballers
Association football forwards
Manchester United F.C. players
Swansea City A.F.C. players
Birmingham City F.C. players
Barrow A.F.C. players
Walsall F.C. players
Portsmouth F.C. players
English Football League players